1960 Soviet Class B was the eleventh season of the Soviet Class B football competitions since their establishment in 1950. It was also the twentieth season of what was eventually became known as the Soviet First League. 

The competition was conducted in two stages. At the first stage teams were slit in multiple groups by republican principle to determine group winners. There were 74 teams in five RSFSR groups, 36 teams in two Ukrainian SSR groups, and 32 teams in two groups for the rest of union republics. At the second stage participants of the RSFSR final played for a single promotion, participants of the Ukrainian SSR final played to qualify for promotion/relegation playoff, while finalists of the Union republics played between each other.

Russian Federation

I Zone

II Zone

III Zone

IV Zone

V Zone

Final
 [Oct 25 – Nov 5, Shakhty]

Ukraine

Final
 [Oct 28, 30, Kiev]
 Metallurg Zaporozhye  6-2 0-0 Sudostroitel Nikolayev

Promotion/relegation play-off
 [Nov 3, 6]
 Shakhtyor Stalino     2-0 0-1 Metallurg Zaporozhye

Union republics

I Zone

Number of teams by republics

II Zone

Number of teams by republics

Final
 [Oct 30, Nov 5] 
 Torpedo Kutaisi  2-0 0-1 Lokomotiv Tbilisi

See also
 Soviet First League

External links
 1960 Soviet Championship and Cup
 1960 season at rsssf.com

1960
2
Soviet
Soviet